Nelton may refer to:

 Nelton Ndebele (born 1985), Zimbabwean sprinter
 Peter Nelton (1853–1936), American politician